Devon Henry Scott (born April 7, 1994) is an American basketball player for Daegu KOGAS Pegasus of the Korean Basketball League (KBL). He is a 6 ft 9 in (206 m), 215 lb (98 kg) forward/center.

Scott is from Columbus, Ohio. His parents are Sean Scott and Karen Smith.

Basketball career
In the Amateur Athletic Union, Scott played for the 17U All-Ohio Red team that won the 2011 AAU national championship. In 2014-15 he averaged 9.1 points and 7.4 rebounds per game.

Scott attended Northland High School ('12) in Columbus.  As a junior, he averaged 11.5 points, 9.9 rebounds, and 2.3 blocked shots per game. As a senior, he averaged 17.2 points per game, and was named Division I Second Team All-Ohio and First Team All-District.

He attended the University of Dayton ('15), playing on its basketball team, the Dayton Flyers. In 2014-15 Scott averaged 9.1 points and 7.4 rebounds per game, and had a .636 field goal percentage. In August 2015, Scott was sentenced to 90 days in jail and five years probation after pleading guilty to several burglaries. He then attended and played basketball for Philander Smith College ('16).

Scott began his professional career with the Wellington Basketball Club of the Canadian Basketball League. On October 4, 2018, he signed with the Club Deportivo Hispano Americano of the Liga Nacional de Básquet Scott averaged 15.8 points, 8.4 rebounds and 2.9 assists per game. During the 2019-20 season, he played with Minas Tênis Clube of the Novo Basquete Brasil, and in 26 games averaged 14.3 points per game.

On May 20, 2020, Scott signed with Hapoel Eilat. On August 7, 2020, he signed with Ironi Nahariya of the Israel Basketball Premier League. In 2020-21 he was second in the Israel Basketball Premier League in two-point field goal percentage (72.3 per cent).

In October 2022, he signed with the San Miguel Beermen of the Philippine Basketball Association (PBA) to replace Diamond Stone as the team's import for the 2022–23 PBA Commissioner's Cup.

References

External links
Dayton Flyers bio

1994 births
Living people
American expatriate basketball people in Argentina
American expatriate basketball people in Brazil
American expatriate basketball people in Canada
American expatriate basketball people in Chile
American expatriate basketball people in the Dominican Republic
American expatriate basketball people in Israel
American expatriate basketball people in Italy
American expatriate basketball people in Mexico
American expatriate basketball people in the Philippines
American expatriate basketball people in South Korea
American men's basketball players
Basket Torino players
Basketball players from Columbus, Ohio
Centers (basketball)
Daegu KOGAS Pegasus players
Dayton Flyers men's basketball players
Fuerza Regia de Monterrey players
Ironi Nahariya players
Philander Smith Panthers men's basketball players
Philippine Basketball Association imports
Power forwards (basketball)
San Miguel Beermen players